Que la famille is the debut mixtape  by French cloud rap duo PNL. It was released on 2 March 2015 through the duo's own QLF Records. The album was preceded by the singles "Différents", "Je vis, je visser", "Gala gala", "La petite voix", "J'comprends pas" and "Simba".

Track listing

Charts

Certifications

References

External links
Official website 

2015 mixtape albums
PNL (rap duo) albums
Debut mixtape albums